Patrick Rajoelina, (*1954, Paris) is a Malagasy politician, lobbyist, author and teacher who has been the Minister of Foreign Affairs of Madagascar since 15 August 2021.

In 2013 he was promoted Chevalier (knight) of the French Legion of Honour.

Personal life
He is the founder of the NGO "Société des amis de Madagascar" and the Lobbying company "Prince – Patrick Rajoelina International Network & Communication".
He is also the author of 8 books about Madagascar.
Rajoelina taught for 20 years at the École supérieure de journalisme de Paris.

He doesn't have any relationship to the Malagasy president Andry Rajoelina.

References

1954 births
Living people
Foreign Ministers of Madagascar
Malagasy politicians